Tiago Miguel Pereira Duque (born 25 June 1994) is a Portuguese footballer who plays for Amora as a centre back.

Club career
On 27 July 2014, Duque made his professional debut with Atlético in a 2014–15 Taça da Liga match against Aves.

References

External links

Stats and profile at LPFP 

1994 births
People from Seixal
Sportspeople from Setúbal District
Living people
Portuguese footballers
Portugal youth international footballers
Association football defenders
C.F. Os Belenenses players
S.U. Sintrense players
Atlético Clube de Portugal players
S.C. Olhanense players
Associação Académica de Coimbra – O.A.F. players
Union Titus Pétange players
Amora F.C. players
S.C. Praiense players
U.D. Oliveirense players
Campeonato de Portugal (league) players
Liga Portugal 2 players
Luxembourg National Division players
Portuguese expatriate footballers
Expatriate footballers in Luxembourg
Portuguese expatriate sportspeople in Luxembourg